Solar Soul is the seventh album by the Swiss heavy metal band Samael, released on 1 June 2007 through Nuclear Blast.

Track listing

Personnel

Samael
 Vorph – guitar, vocals
 Xy – keyboard, drums, programming, production
 Mas – bass
 Makro – guitar

Additional musicians
 Sami Yli-Sirniö – sitar (10)
 Vibeke Stene – vocals (7)

Technical personnel
 Waldemar Sorychta – production
 D-Teck – engineering
 Stéphane Loup – engineering
 Stefan Glaumann – mixing
 Tor Ingvarsson – Pro Tools assistant
 Henrik Jonsson – mastering
 Patrick Pidoux – front cover, additional graphics
 Edi Maurer – portraits
 Petri de Pità – band picture
 Carsten Drescher – layouts

Charts

References

2007 albums
Samael (band) albums
Nuclear Blast albums
Albums produced by Waldemar Sorychta